Yue Kok is a village in Tai Po District, Hong Kong.

Administration
Yue Kok is a recognized village under the New Territories Small House Policy. It is one of the villages represented within the Tai Po Rural Committee. For electoral purposes, Yue Kok is part of the Hong Lok Yuen constituency, which was formerly represented by Zero Yiu Yeuk-sang until May 2021.

See also
 Tai Po Industrial Estate

References

External links

 Delineation of area of existing village Yue Kok (Tai Po) for election of resident representative (2019 to 2022)

Villages in Tai Po District, Hong Kong